The following list of Carnegie libraries in Utah provides detailed information on United States Carnegie libraries in Utah, where 23 libraries were built from 23 grants (totaling $255,470) awarded by the Carnegie Corporation of New York from 1901 to 1919. As of 2020, 16 of these buildings are still standing, and 10 still operate as libraries.

Key

Carnegie libraries

Notes

References

Note: The above references, while all authoritative, are not entirely mutually consistent. Some details of this list may have been drawn from one of the references without support from the others.  Reader discretion is advised.

External links
  (PDF) from the National Register of Historic Places

Utah
Libraries
 
Libraries